Granville Township is one of eighteen townships in Platte County, Nebraska, United States. The population was 949 at the 2020 census. A 2021 estimate placed the township's population at 939.

Most of the City of Humphrey and the entire Village of Cornlea lie within the Township.

History
Granville Township was organized in 1876.

See also
County government in Nebraska

References

External links
City-Data.com

Townships in Platte County, Nebraska
Townships in Nebraska